Postal abbreviation can refer to:
Australian postal abbreviations
Canadian subnational postal abbreviations
United States postal abbreviations